Gillian McAllister (born 28 February 1985) is a British Sunday Times and New York Times bestselling author, known for seven novels, all of which have been bestsellers. Her works have been translated into 40 languages. She has been selected for the Reese Witherspoon book club, the Richard and Judy book club, the Radio 2 book club and shortlisted for a national book award. Several of her novels have been optioned for television and film. Her seventh novel, Wrong Place Wrong Time, reached number 4 on the Sunday Times bestseller list and number 2 on the New York Times bestseller list.   

Her works are: Everything But The Truth (2017), Anything You Do Say (published as The Choice in North America), No Further Questions (published as The Good Sister in North America), The Evidence Against You, How To Disappear, which reached number 8 on the Sunday Times bestseller list, That Night which was a Richard & Judy book club pick, reached number 8 on The Sunday Times bestseller list and number 1 on the Kindle Store and Wrong Place Wrong Time which became an immediate Sunday Times bestseller in hardback reaching position 4. Wrong Place Wrong Time was chosen for the Reese Witherspoon's book club for August 2022. The following week, it reached number 2 on the New York Times bestsellers list.

Life and career

McAllister was born in Sutton Coldfield and raised in Tamworth. After attending Belgrave High School in Tamworth (now known as Tamworth Enterprise College) and receiving A-Levels, McAllister read English at the University of Birmingham, receiving a 2:1 BA Hons. She then converted to law, studying the GDL and receiving a commendation. McAllister received a distinction in her Legal Practice Course (LPC) from The College of Law, before working as a solicitor in two Birmingham-based legal practises.

McAllister wrote fiction in her spare time throughout adulthood, often writing in the evenings and commutes to and from work. She finished her first full (unpublished) novel while suffering from glandular fever for two years. Her debut published novel, Everything But The Truth, was published by Michael Joseph, an imprint of Penguin Random House UK,. In its first week, Everything But The Truth reached number six in the Sunday Times Bestseller List. Translation rights have been sold to several foreign publishers. Each of her subsequent novels have been top 20 bestsellers, with her fifth and six, How To Disappear and That Night, hitting the top ten. That Night was selected for the Richard and Judy book club and reached number 1 on the Kindle Store. 

Wrong Place Wrong Time has been sold into 31 foreign territories and became an instant global bestseller. Her next novel is Just Another Missing Person, coming 2023.

Bibliography
 Everything But The Truth (2017)
 Anything You Do Say (2017) 
 No Further Questions (2018) 
 The Evidence Against You (2019)
 How To Disappear (2020)
 That Night (2021) 
 Wrong Place Wrong Time (2021)

References

External links
Author homepage

1985 births
Living people
British writers